The 2023 FIBA Women's Asia Cup will be the 30th edition of the tournament, and will be held from 26 June to 2 July 2023 in Sydney, Australia. This is the first time Australia is hosting tournament.

Qualified teams
Seven teams from the last edition qualified for this year's tournament and the winner of the Division B tournament, Lebanon.

For Division A:
Semifinalists at the 2021 FIBA Women's Asia Cup:

 5th-7th Placers of the 2021 FIBA Women's Asia Cup:

 Division B Winner of the 2021 FIBA Women's Asia Cup:

For Division B:

The FIBA Women's Asia Cup 2023 Division B will be held later from 13 to 19 August 2023 in Bangkok, Thailand.

References

External links
Official publisher

2023
June 2023 sports events in Australia
July 2023 sports events in Australia
2022–23 in Asian basketball
2023 in women's basketball
International basketball competitions hosted by Australia
FIBA
Basketball
FIBA